Baba Kuseh-ye Olya (also Romanized as Bābā Kūseh-ye ‘Olyā; also known as Bābā Kūseh and Tāzehābād) is a village in Qalkhani Rural District, Gahvareh District, Dalahu County, Kermanshah Province, Iran. At the 2006 census, its population was 156, in 36 families.

References 

Populated places in Dalahu County